Dharma Mahadevi (died 950), was the queen regnant of the Indian Bhauma-Kara dynasty's Kingdom of Toshala in circa 940-950. 

She was born a princess of the Bhanj dynasty. She was married to Santikaradeva III. 

She succeeded queen Vakula Mahadevi, her husband's sister-in-law. She is known to have issued two charters, one for Angul and another for Taltali. Not much is known about her rule. 

She was the last ruler of the Bhauma-Kara dynasty. She was possibly assassinated by Yayati I of the Somavamshi dynasty, the brother of Tribhuvana Mahadevi II who had been deposed in 896; he drove the Bhanjas from the Baud-Sonepur region and then occupied the Odisha, leading to the Somavamsis taking over the administration of Tosali.

References 

 Archana Garodia Gupta, The Women Who Ruled India: Leaders. Warriors. Icons.

10th-century women rulers
10th-century Indian monarchs
10th-century Indian women
10th-century Indian people
950 deaths